Tim Hicks (born August 22, 1979) is a Canadian country music singer-songwriter from St. Catharines, Ontario. Since releasing his debut single "Get By" in 2012, he has had eighteen top ten hits on the Canada Country chart. His songs include: Throw Down, 5:01, Shake These Walls, and New Tattoo.

Hicks has earned four nominations for the JUNO Awards. He has also won a CCMA Award, earned two platinum selling singles, seven gold singles ("Loud" is one), one gold album, and two No. 1 chart topping singles including "What A Song Should Do", and "No Truck Song".

Personal life
At the age of six, Hicks started taking music lessons at the Ontario Conservatory of Music in Niagara Falls. Tim is married to Amanda Hicks, and they have 2 children. Tim Hicks currently splits his time between Nashville and his hometown in Ontario.

In 2002, Hicks graduated from the University of Waterloo with a bachelor's in Psychology. During his time at the University of Waterloo, Hicks spent his spare time playing at open mic nights across the Waterloo Region.

Career

Early career 
Early in his career, Tim Hicks used his love for music and a desire to learn as a way to hone his talent. He built a loyal and dedicated fan base in his home town of Niagara Falls by frequently playing at the local pubs and wineries. This is what led to him being discovered by Open Road Recordings.

Record Deal and Throw Down
In 2011, Hicks signed a deal with his record label Open Road Recordings. Since then he has been consistently writing songs and releasing music.

After he signed with Open Road Recordings, Tim had the chance to open for Dallas Smith and Chad Brownlee on the “Boys Of Fall" tour in 2012.

In 2013, Tim Hicks released his debut album Throw Down, which featured his debut single "Get By" that has since been certified Platinum. “Get By” landed in the Top 10 at Country Radio in less than 8 weeks and became his first Gold single.

“Get By” performed well on the digital charts as the #1 selling Canadian Country single for more than 17 weeks. An impressive milestone for a new Canadian country artist.

According to Mediabase, Hicks was the most played debut country artist in 2013 and was also the best selling digital Canadian country artist of the year.

“Stronger Beer” 
One of the tracks “Stronger Beer” from Hicks 'Throw Down album is a humorous take on the comparisons of Canadian and American cultures.  

Although the song was never released as a single, a lyric video was released March 8, 2013, and became a cultural hit. The song has gone on to become an ‘anthem’ of sorts with over 10 million streams and was certified Platinum in Canada in May 2017.  

“Stronger Beer” remains his most popular song to be performed at his concerts, particularly on Canada Day.

5:01, 5:01+, and Tim Hicks
Tim Hicks' sophomore album 5:01 was released August 5, 2014. This album featured the Top 10 singles "Here Comes the Thunder", "She Don’t Drink Whiskey Anymore", and "So Do I".  

In 2014, it was announced that Hicks would join Dierks Bentley’s “Riser" tour as an opening act for its Canadian dates.

An extended version of 5:01 called 5:01+ was released on July 10, 2015 with four new songs, including the Top 10 hit "Young, Alive and in Love". "Young, Alive and in Love" also reached Top 10 in Australia on the CMC Top 50 charts.  

Later in the Fall of 2015, Tim headlined his first Canadian national tour called the “Get A Little Crazy Tour”, with openers Cold Creek County and Jason Benoit.

Tim Hicks, a combination of hits from Throw Down and 5:01+, was released in Australia and New Zealand on Jan 28, 2016 through ABC Music. This album reached #4 on the iTunes charts.

Shake These Walls and “Shake These Walls” Tour 
Tim’s next album Shake These Walls was released Sept 9, 2016. It was produced by CMA and Grammy nominee Corey Crowder. The album Featured the Top 10 singles “Stompin’ Ground”, “Slow Burn”, “Slide Over”, and “Forever Rebels”.  

In 2017 Tim Hicks headlined his second nationwide tour, called the “Shake These Walls Tour”.  

CMT TV aired a special on the “Shake These Walls" tour titled “Tim Hicks Sudbury Sunday Night”. The special was nominated for a CCMA Award and Certified for two CIMA Road Gold Awards.

New Tattoo and “Get Loud” Tour 
In 2018, Hicks was presented with the first Nielsen Compass Award at the Country Music Association of Ontario Awards. This award recognizes an artist for the most total content plays including streams, single and album sales as well as total social media following. He won the award again in 2019.

In March 2018, Hicks joined Brantley Gilbert’s tour as an opening act throughout Western Canada.

In June 2018, Hicks released his fourth studio album New Tattoo and announced his “Get Loud” tour. His first single “LOUD” from this album was licensed by the NHL across North America. The song was used on Sportsnet and NBC Sports in various promotional segments.

The “Get Loud” tour was his third headlining national tour in Canada and featured Tebey, Madeline Merlo, and Andrew Hyatt as opening acts. For the tour he partnered with PLUS1 and donated $1 from every ticket sold to the Unison Fund.  

His next single from New Tattoo "What A Song Should Do" became his first number 1 song at Canadian country radio. This song also reached number one on Australia’s CMC Chart.

By the end of 2018, it was announced that Hicks was the 7th most played Canadian country artist for that year.

Wreck This and Campfire Troubador
In early 2020, Hicks announced the “Wreck This Town World Tour” along with a digital release of Wreck a 3-song EP which included the single "No Truck Song". “No Truck Song” was produced by Jeff Coplan and co-written by Tim Hicks, Coplan, and Bruce Wallace. "No Truck Song" became Hicks' second number one single at Canadian country radio. Hicks expanded on his previous EP with a 6-track extended play Wreck This released on June 26, 2020.

In 2021, he released the extended play Campfire Troubador, which included the single "The Good, the Bad and the Pretty". He released a new single, "Whiskey Does", in February 2022.

Discography

Studio albums

Live albums

Extended plays

Singles

As featured artist

Other songs

Music videos

Awards and nominations

References

External links 

Canadian country singer-songwriters
Canadian male singer-songwriters
Living people
Musicians from St. Catharines
People from Niagara Falls, Ontario
Canadian Country Music Association Rising Star Award winners
20th-century births
21st-century Canadian male singers
University of Waterloo alumni
Year of birth missing (living people)